Semussac is a commune in the Charente-Maritime department in southwestern France.

Population

See also
Communes of the Charente-Maritime department

References

Communes of Charente-Maritime